The Domogled-Valea Cernei National Park is a protected area (national park category II IUCN) situated in Romania, on the administrative territory of counties Caraș-Severin, Gorj, and Mehedinți.

Location 
The National Park stretches across over the Cerna Mountains and the Godeanu Mountains on the right side, and over the Vâlcan Mountains and the Mehedinți Mountains on the left side.  It is located in the Retezat-Godeanu Mountains group, a group of mountains in the Southern Carpathians, in the Cerna River basin.

Description 

Nature reserve 
Protected areas included in the park:
 In Caraș-Severin County
Coronini-Bedina (3,864.80 ha)
Domogled (2,382.80 ha)
Iardașița (501.60 ha)
Iauna - Craiova (1,545.10 ha)
Bârzoni Cave (0.10 ha) 
 In Gorj County
Piatra Cloșanilor (1,730 ha)
Cheile Corcoaiei (34 ha)
Ciucevele Cernei (1,166 ha) 
 In Mehedinți County
Vârful lui Stan (120 ha)
Valea Țesna (160 ha).

See also 
 Protected areas of Romania

References 

National parks of Romania
Protected areas established in 2000
Geography of Caraș-Severin County
Geography of Gorj County
Geography of Mehedinți County
Tourist attractions in Caraș-Severin County
Tourist attractions in Gorj County
Tourist attractions in Mehedinți County
Primeval Beech Forests in Europe
Important Bird Areas of Romania